Brendon Davis (born July 28, 1997) is an American professional baseball infielder and outfielder in the Detroit Tigers organization. He made his Major League Baseball debut with the Tigers in 2022.

Amateur career
Davis attended Lakewood High School in Lakewood, California. He committed to Cal State Fullerton to play college baseball. Davis did not play in his senior season after breaking his arm in an off-season accident. Davis was drafted by the Los Angeles Dodgers in the 5th round of the 2015 MLB draft. Davis signed with Los Angeles for a $918,600 signing bonus, which was $605,000 over slot value.

Professional career

Los Angeles Dodgers
Davis split his professional debut of 2015 between the AZL Dodgers and the Ogden Raptors, hitting a combined .254/.289/.325/.614 with 1 home run and 17 RBI. Davis spent the 2016 season with the Great Lakes Loons, hitting .241/.295/.334/.629 with 5 home runs and 49 RBI. Davis opened the 2017 season with Great Lakes and the Rancho Cucamonga Quakes.

Texas Rangers
On July 31, 2017, the Dodgers traded Davis, A. J. Alexy, and Willie Calhoun to the Texas Rangers in exchange for Yu Darvish. Davis finished the 2017 season with the Hickory Crawdads. Between the three teams, he hit .230/.341/.379/.720 with 11 home runs and 49 RBI in 2017. Davis spent the 2018 season with the Down East Wood Ducks, hitting .254/.334/.365/.699 with 6 home runs and 40 RBI. He spent the 2019 season with the Frisco RoughRiders, hitting just .202/.298/.272/.569 with 3 home runs and 35 RBI. Davis did not play in 2020 due to the cancellation of the Minor League Baseball season due to the COVID-19 pandemic.

Los Angeles Angels
On December 10, 2020, Davis was selected by the Los Angeles Angels in the minor league phase of the Rule 5 draft. Davis split the 2021 season between the Tri-City Dust Devils, the Rocket City Trash Pandas, and the Salt Lake Bees, combining to hit .290/.361/.561/.923 with 30 home runs, 83 RBI, and 16 stolen bases. On November 5, 2021, Davis was selected to the Angels 40-man roster. He opened the 2022 season back with Salt Lake, hitting .243/.333/.463/.797 with 6 home runs and 25 RBI over 36 games.

Detroit Tigers
On May 20, 2022, Davis was claimed off waivers by the Detroit Tigers. On October 1, Davis made his major-league debut against the Minnesota Twins. On November 18, he was non tendered and became a free agent. He resigned a minor league deal on November 29, 2022.

References

External links

1997 births
Living people
People from Lakewood, California
Baseball players from California
African-American baseball players
Major League Baseball infielders
Major League Baseball outfielders
Detroit Tigers players
Arizona League Dodgers players
Ogden Raptors players
Great Lakes Loons players
Rancho Cucamonga Quakes players
Hickory Crawdads players
Down East Wood Ducks players
Frisco RoughRiders players
Salt Lake Bees players
Rocket City Trash Pandas players
Tri-City Dust Devils players
Toledo Mud Hens players
21st-century African-American sportspeople